Maxence Mailfort (born 24 February 1949) is a French film and television actor.

Selected filmography
 The Discrete Charm of the Bourgeoisie (1972)
 George Who? (1973)
 Identikit (1974)
 Successive Slidings of Pleasure (1974)
 Bartleby (1976)

References

External links

1949 births
Living people
French male film actors
20th-century French male actors